Mad Thad is a Hardbop jazz album by Thad Jones recorded in 1957 for Period Records.

Track listing 
 Whisper Not (Benny Golson) – 5:35
 Quiet Sip (Thad Jones) – 9:01
 Ballad Medley:
 Flamingo (Ted Grouya, Edmund Anderson) – 1:59
 If You Were Mine (Johnny Mercer, Matty Malneck) – 1:31
 I'm Through With Love (Johnny Mercer, Gus Kahn and Joseph A. "Fud" Livingston) – 1:40
 Love Walked In (George Gershwin, Ira Gershwin) – 2:10
 Cat Meets Chick (Leonard Feather) – 5:22
 Bird Song (Thad Jones) – 8:21
 Jumping For Jane (Jane Feather) – 5:31
 Mad Thad (Quincy Jones) – 4:39

Personnel 
24 December 1956 Session:  (Tracks 1,6,7)
 Thad Jones – Trumpet, Composer
 Jimmy Jones – Piano
 Frank Foster – Sax, (Tenor)
 Doug Watkins – Bass
 Jo Jones – Drums
 Quincy Jones – Arranger, Conductor on 1,7

6 January 1957 Session: (Tracks 2,3,4,5)
 Thad Jones – Trumpet, Composer
 Frank Wess – Sax, (Tenor), Flute
 Henry Coker – Trombone
 Tommy Flanagan – Piano
 Jimmy Jones – Piano
 Eddie Jones – Bass
 Elvin Jones – Drums

References

External links 
Original Jazz Classics (Concord Music Group) 1999 CD re-issue: concordmusicgroup.com/...

Thad Jones albums
1957 albums